Kate Soper (born 1943) is a British philosopher. She is currently Visiting Professor at the University of Brighton.

Background
Soper was educated at the University of Oxford (BA) and worked as a translator and journalist. Her PhD was from Sussex University titled Marxism and the Theory of Needs. She taught at Sussex university before moving to the University of North London in 1987 (which became part of London Metropolitan University in 2002). She taught a range of undergraduate and postgraduate courses in European Studies and Literature and Modernity.
She retired c.2009, becoming Emeritus Professor.

Contributions
Soper is the author of and contributor to over a dozen books on feminism and Continental Philosophy, addressing the works of Jean-Paul Sartre, Karl Marx and Simone de Beauvoir, among others. Her other contributions have been to consumption theory and environmental philosophy. She is a critic of post-structuralist feminism.

She has also translated several texts into English, including includes Chiodi's Sartre And Marxism, Sebastiano Timpanaro's The Freudian Slip, Bobbio's Liberalism And Democracy (with Martin Ryle), and (with Martin Ryle) Ginzburg's Wooden Eyes.

She has been involved in several environmentalist and peace movements in both the United Kingdom and the rest of Europe and her writing addresses radical ecological issues. Her contributions have appeared in the journals Radical Philosophy, New Left Review and Capitalism, Nature, Socialism. In 1998 Soper interviewed Noam Chomsky. Her study of the role that new thinking about pleasure and the 'good life' can play in promoting sustainable consumption (Alternative hedonism and the theory and politics of consumption) was funded in the
ESRC/AHRC 'Cultures of Consumption' Programme in the mid 2000s.

Her other work includes radio and television appearances (Dinner with Portillo, Channel Five, December 2005: Radio 3, Nightwaves, April 2004), and a number of exhibitions.

Selected works
 Soper K. 2020. Post-Growth Living: For an Alternative Hedonism. Verso. 
Soper K., L. Thomas and M. Ryle (eds.). 2009. The Politics and Pleasures of Consuming Differently. Palgrave.
 Soper K. and F Trentmann (eds.). 2008. Citizenship and Consumption. Palgrave.
 Soper K. and M. Ryle. 2001. To Relish the Sublime: Culture and Self-realisation in Postmodern  Times. Verso.
 Soper K. 1995. What Is Nature?: Culture, Politics and the Non-Human. Blackwell.
 Soper K. 1990. Troubled Pleasures: Writings on Politics, Gender and Hedonism. Verso.
 Soper K. 1986. Humanism and Anti-Humanism (Problems of Modern European Thought). Hutchinson.
 Soper K. 1981. On Human Needs. Harvester.

References

External links
 A list of contributions to Radical Philosophy

1943 births
Living people
20th-century British philosophers
21st-century British philosophers
Academics of London Metropolitan University
Continental philosophers
Feminist studies scholars
Feminist philosophers
British feminists
Postmodern feminists
British women philosophers